Greeks on the Roof was a short-lived Australian television talk show and variety show that ran for 11 episodes on the Seven Network from 1 April to 1 July 2003. It was hosted by the actress/comedian Mary Coustas in character as Effie, a second generation Greek Australian, whom she had portrayed on the sitcom Acropolis Now, and featured her "family" of Greek immigrants portrayed by Maria Mercedes, Angus Sampson as cousin Dimi, Serge De Nardo, and Evelyn Krape.

Origins
Based on the format of the British TV show The Kumars at No. 42, each show had interviews with a number of Australian actors and actresses. Guests were involved in Effie's jokes and antics while being asked about their career and personal life.

Guest stars
Guests included Sam Newman, who is a personality on the rival Channel Nine network, Molly Meldrum before he signed a contract with Seven, and Dr. Harry Cooper who in promos was told he would reveal his full self by taking off his hat, but in the show he never did. The American talk show host Jerry Springer also made a guest appearance.

Production
Kris Noble was the executive producer of the show.

References 

Australian television talk shows
Australian variety television shows
Seven Network original programming
Television shows set in Victoria (Australia)
2003 Australian television series debuts
2003 Australian television series endings
Television series about television